Zur occurs five times in the King James Bible as the name of various people and a state.

This is the pericope where Numbers 25:1 tells us that Israel abode in Shittim, and the people began to commit whoredom with the daughters of Moab(Patriarch of Moab):

And the name of the Midianitish woman that was slain was Cozbi, the daughter of Zur; he was head over a people, and of a chief house in Midian.

Here, the nation of Israel is warring against the Midianites, and a body-count is given:

And they slew the kings of Midian, beside the rest of them that were slain; namely, Evi, and Rekem, and Zur, and Hur, and Reba, five kings of Midian: Balaam also the son of Beor they slew with the sword.
And the children of Israel took all the women of Midian captives, and their little ones, and took the spoil of all their cattle, and all their flocks, and all their goods.

 The third mention is a recapitulation of the second, at the pericope of Joshua's death-scene, :

And all the cities of the plain, and all the kingdom of Sihon king of the Amorites, which reigned in Heshbon, whom Moses smote with the princes of Midian, Evi, and Rekem, and Zur , and Hur, and Reba, which were dukes of Sihon, dwelling in the country.

The fourth mention is in the begats at :

And his firstborn son Abdon, and Zur, and Kish, and Baal, and Nadab

 The fifth mention is about the servers at the temple, :

And in Gibeon dwelt the father of Gibeon, Jehiel, whose wife's name was Maachah:
And his firstborn son Abdon, then Zur, and Kish, and Baal, and Ner, and Nadab.

See also
 Tzur

Midian
Torah monarchs
Gibeon (ancient city)